Worlds Remixed is the debut remix album by American electronic music producer Porter Robinson. The album features remixes of each track from his debut LP Worlds. Remixers include artists and producers such as Mat Zo, Odesza, Sleepy Tom, Galimatias and San Holo. It was released on October 2, 2015.

Background
On September 3, 2015, Porter Robinson announced Worlds Remixed via Facebook. The project had been delayed multiple times in the past. Talking to Billboards Steve Baltin, Robinson stated that one of the reasons was due to a remixer dropping out. He also said that his favourite track on the remix album was the Mat Zo remix of "Flicker".

Promotion
Porter Robinson premiered the Mat Zo remix of "Flicker" at the Monstercat Label showcase event in Toronto. It was later released as a single in September. Robinson called the remix "one of the best remixes I've ever gotten in my life."

Track listing
The track listing was confirmed on September 4, 2015, by Robinson through his Facebook page.

References

2015 remix albums
Remix albums by American artists
Porter Robinson albums